Assunna Mosque (Berber: ⵎⴻⵣⴳⵉⴷⴰ ⴰⵙⵓⵏⴰ) is a mosque designed by Jean-François Zevaco in a modernist architectural style in Casablanca, Morocco in 1966. It features brutalist architectural elements such as raw concrete. It is located at the junction of Blvd. 2 Mars and Blvd. Modibo Keïta.

It drew inspiration from Oscar Niemeyer's Church of Saint Francis of Assisi in Pampulha, Belo Horizonte.

See also
 Islam in Morocco

References 

Religious buildings and structures in Casablanca
Mosques in Morocco
Brutalist architecture in Africa
Modernist architecture
Religious buildings and structures completed in 1966
1966 establishments in Morocco
20th-century architecture in Morocco